Reginald Heber Roe (3 August 1850 – 21 September 1926) was a headmaster of Brisbane Grammar School, Queensland, Australia and first vice-chancellor of the University of Queensland.

Early life
Roe was born at Blandford, Dorset, England, the son of John Banister Roe, a draper, and Mary Anne née Allies. 
Reginald had a sister, Eliza Banister Roe (wife of Alfred Downing Fripp, artist) and a brother Henry Dalton Roe (Master Mariner). Reginald Roe was educated at Christ's Hospital school, London, was head Grecian in 1869, and won a scholarship which took him to Balliol College, Oxford, intending to enter the Church. Roe rowed in the college eight and won first-class honours in the final mathematics in 1872 and second-class honours in the final classical schools in 1874. Roe graduated B.A. (1875) and M.A. (1876). He was a private tutor at Oxford for a short period.

Career
In 1876, Roe was appointed headmaster of the Brisbane Grammar School (founded  1868) and had only a small number of pupils, but during Roe's reign of 33 years he built up a great public school. He was a good administrator and recruited quality staff; he was thoroughly interested in the problems of education, and, an athlete himself, realized the importance of games and the help they could give in the development of the boy's character. Roe married Annie Maud, daughter of Captain Claudius Buchanan Whish, on 23 December 1879 in Brisbane.

Roe worked tirelessly for the foundation of a university in Queensland, and in 1890 gave an address on "A University as a Part of National Life". He was for a period president of the university extension movement, and, when the University of Queensland was established in 1910, became its first vice-chancellor and held this position until 1916. He was an early member of the Australasian Association for the Advancement of Science, was a member of its publication committee, and at the meeting held at Christchurch in January 1891, was president of the literature and fine arts section. His presidential address is printed in the Report of that meeting. Roe had visited England in 1900 and reported to the Queensland department of public instruction on state inspection as applied to secondary schools. In 1909 he resigned from Brisbane Grammar School to become inspector general of schools and chief educational adviser to the Queensland government, retiring in 1919. He died at Brisbane on 21 September 1926 and buried in Toowong Cemetery. He was survived by his wife, four sons and two daughters. Roe's third son, (Dr) Arthur Stanley Roe, became the first Queensland Rhodes scholar in 1904.

Legacy
Roe was a good swimmer, rower and lawn tennis player, and has been called the father of lawn tennis in Queensland. At different periods was president of the Queensland Rowing, Swimming and Lawn Tennis associations. He was also a member of the Queensland Club. As an educationist he was a combination of learning and sound common-sense, interested in ideals and all things intended for the improvement of mankind. Roe did useful work as educational adviser to the government and as vice-chancellor in the difficult early days of the university, but his greatest influence was as the head of a great school.

References

External links
Roe Reginald Heber — Brisbane City Council Grave Location Search

1850 births
1926 deaths
Australian headmasters
Alumni of Balliol College, Oxford
Burials at Toowong Cemetery
British emigrants to colonial Australia